Osmín Aguirre y Salinas (25 December 1889 – 17 July 1977) was a Salvadoran military officer and politician who served as the provisional president of El Salvador from 21 October 1944 until 1 March 1945. A Colonel in the Salvadoran Army, Aguirre y Salinas led two successful coups against the Salvadoran government: once in 1931 (installing General Maximiliano Hernández Martínez in power) and again in 1944 (installing himself in power). He left office in 1945, with the assurance that his successor in the next election would be Salvador Castaneda Castro. He was later assassinated near his home in San Salvador at the age of 87.

The Supreme Court declared his term unconstitutional, and the United States did not recognize his coming to power, which deemed his regime pro-fascist.

Personal life 

Osmín Aguirre y Salinas was born in San Miguel, San Miguel, on 24 December 1889.

He married Mrs. Rosa Cardona (1904–1991) and fathered four children.

Government of Hernández Martínez 

On 2 December 1931, President Arturo Araujo was overthrown by Army officers over anger that they had not been paid. Colonel Osmín Aguirre y Salinas took part in the coup and helped establish the Civic Directory. The Civic Directory handed over the Presidency of El Salvador to then Vice President General Maximiliano Hernández Martínez on December 4. Aguirre y Salinas acted as Director of the National Police during Hernández Martínez's presidency from 1931 through 1944.

In January 1932, peasants across western El Salvador took up arms against the government after legislative elections were cancelled by President Hernández Martínez. In what would become a massacre of 25,000 to 40,000 indigenous peasants and communists, Aguirre y Salinas was put in charge of capturing Farabundo Martí, one of the rebellion's communist leaders.

Presidency 

On 9 May 1944, Maximiliano Hernández Martínez resigned due to an attempted coup, strikes being conducted against his government, and pressure from the United States. After Hernández Martínez's resignation, Andrés Ignacio Menéndez became Provisional President of El Salvador. On 21 October 1944, Aguirre y Salinas and other military officers who previously supported Hernández Martínez overthrew Andrés Ignacio Menéndez's government and established himself as Provisional President of El Salvador. He cracked down on political opposition which lead to an armed uprising being launched by students in San Salvador on 8 December, followed by an insurgent attack from Guatemala four days later where dictator Jorge Ubico had been overthrown in July. Both movements were crushed by the Aguirre y Salinas government, which thus consolidated its position in power.

During his brief and short presidency, he issued a decree reforming the regulations of executive power on 28 February 1945, with the purpose of making a "more rational distribution of the different branches of public administration" and considering "urgent the introduction of some reforms to the Regulation of the Executive Power, so that the incoming Government can organize said services on new bases."

In January 1945, Aguirre y Salinas oversaw the presidential elections and ran in them to be elected to a second term. The election was boycotted by five candidates who withdrew after accusing Osmín Aguirre y Salinas of unfair election practices to ensure victory for his favored candidate. The election ended in a victory for Salvador Castaneda Castro of the Social Democratic Unification Party with 312,754 votes and a margin of 99.70 percent. Aguirre y Salinas himself only received 690 votes, a margin of 0.22 percent, in the heavily rigged election.

Aguirre y Salinas' term ended on 1 March 1945 and Castaneda Castro was sworn in as President. He continued to harbour political aspirations in opposition to the rule of Castaneda Castro and run for the presidency, until the military coup of 1948.

Assassination 

Aguirre y Salinas was assassinated on 12 July 1977 in San Salvador while he was being taken to the Military Hospital. He was 87 years old at the time of his death.

See also 

 Maximiliano Hernández Martínez

References 

1889 births
1977 deaths
People from San Miguel, El Salvador
Salvadoran people of Basque descent
Presidents of El Salvador
Salvadoran military personnel
Leaders who took power by coup
World War II political leaders
People murdered in El Salvador
Assassinated Salvadoran politicians
1977 crimes in El Salvador
1977 murders in North America
1970s murders in El Salvador
Defence ministers of El Salvador